Lithophane oriunda, the immigrant pinion, is a species of cutworm or dart moth in the family Noctuidae. It is found in North America.

The MONA or Hodges number for Lithophane oriunda is 9894.

References

Further reading

 
 
 

oriunda
Articles created by Qbugbot
Moths described in 1874